Sycacantha is a genus of moths belonging to the subfamily Olethreutinae of the family Tortricidae.

Species
Sycacantha amphimorpha Diakonoff, 1973
Sycacantha atactodes (Turner, 1946)
Sycacantha beatana Kuznetzov, 2003
Sycacantha caryozona Diakonoff, 1973
Sycacantha castanicolor (Turner, 1946)
Sycacantha catharia Diakonoff, 1973
Sycacantha choanantha Diakonoff, 1971
Sycacantha cinerascens Diakonoff, 1973
Sycacantha complicitana (Walker, 1863)
Sycacantha concentra Diakonoff, 1973
Sycacantha crocamicta Diakonoff, 1973
Sycacantha diakonoffi Kawabe, 1987
Sycacantha diatoma Diakonoff, 1966
Sycacantha dissita Diakonoff, 1973
Sycacantha escharota (Meyrick, 1910)
Sycacantha exedra (Turner, 1916)
Sycacantha formosa Diakonoff, 1971
Sycacantha hilarograpta (Meyrick, 1933)
Sycacantha homichlodes Diakonoff, 1973
Sycacantha incondita Diakonoff, 1973
Sycacantha inopinata Diakonoff, 1973
Sycacantha maior Diakonoff, 1973
Sycacantha montana Razowski, 2009
Sycacantha nereidopa (Meyrick, 1927)
Sycacantha ngoclinhana Razowski, 2009
Sycacantha niphostetha (Turner, 1946)
Sycacantha obtundana Kuznetzov, 1988
Sycacantha occulta Diakonoff, 1973
Sycacantha orphnogenes (Meyrick, 1939)
Sycacantha ostracachtys Diakonoff, 1973
Sycacantha pararufata Razowski, 2009
Sycacantha penthrana (Bradley, 1965)
Sycacantha placida (Meyrick, 1911)
Sycacantha platymolybdis (Meyrick, 1930)
Sycacantha potamographa Diakonoff, 1968
Sycacantha praeclara Diakonoff, 1973
Sycacantha quadrata Diakonoff, 1973
Sycacantha regionalis (Meyrick, 1934)
Sycacantha rhodocroca Diakonoff, 1973
Sycacantha rivulosa (Diakonoff, 1953)
Sycacantha rotundata Diakonoff, 1983
Sycacantha rufescens Diakonoff, 1973
Sycacantha siamensis Diakonoff, 1971
Sycacantha solemnis Diakonoff, 1973
Sycacantha sphaerocosmana (Meyrick, 1881)
Sycacantha subiecta Diakonoff, 1973
Sycacantha symplecta (Turner, 1946)
Sycacantha tapaenophyes Diakonoff, 1973
Sycacantha thermographa Diakonoff, 1973
Sycacantha tornophanes (Meyrick, 1930)
Sycacantha versicolor Diakonoff, 1973

See also
List of Tortricidae genera

References

External links
tortricidae.com

 
Olethreutini
Tortricidae genera
Taxa named by Alexey Diakonoff